Dolné Srnie is a village and municipality in Nové Mesto nad Váhom District in the Trenčín Region of western Slovakia.

History
In historical records the village was first mentioned in 1477.

Geography
The municipality lies at an altitude of 230 metres and covers an area of 8.788 km². It has a population of about 928 people.

Genealogical resources

The records for genealogical research are available at the state archive "Statny Archiv in Bratislava, Slovakia"

See also
 List of municipalities and towns in Slovakia

References

External links

  Official page
https://web.archive.org/web/20071116010355/http://www.statistics.sk/mosmis/eng/run.html
Surnames of living people in Dolne Srnie

Villages and municipalities in Nové Mesto nad Váhom District